Christopher George Prowting (born 2 June 1988) is a former English first-class cricketer.

Born at Chelmsford, Prowting played Second XI cricket for Essex from 2004–2007, though he was unable to force his way into the first eleven. He made a single appearance in first-class cricket for the Marylebone Cricket Club against Sri Lanka A at Arundel. Keeping wicket in the match, Prowting scored 2 runs in the MCC first-innings, before being dismissed by Rangana Herath, while in their second-innings he was dismissed by Dilruwan Perera for 48.

His brother, Nick Prowting, played first-class cricket for Durham UCCE.

References

External links

1988 births
Living people
Sportspeople from Chelmsford
English cricketers
Marylebone Cricket Club cricketers